Carpatolechia digitilobella is a moth of the family Gelechiidae. It is found in Korea and Japan.

The forewings are covered with greyish brown scales and there are three oblique fascia with well developed scale tufts. The hindwings are pale grey. Adults are on wing from early May to mid-August.

References

Moths described in 1992
Carpatolechia
Moths of Korea
Moths of Japan